Sir Daniel Norton Idris Pearce  (born 28 November 1933) is a British businessman, executive, and chartered surveyor. He began his career at Richard Ellis (Richard Ellis International Ltd) in 1959, and has been a partner since 1961. He served as Manager Partner from 1981-87. He has been Chairman, English Estates since 1989, and an adviser to the National Health Service's Manager Board (1985–90).

Pearce was on the Advisory Panel for Institutional Finance in New Towns from 1974–80, on the Property Services Agency Advisory Board from 1981–86, on the Foreign and Commonwealth Office's Advisory Panel on Diplomatic Estate since 1985. He has been a member (since 1980) of the General Council of the Royal Institution of Chartered Surveyors. Pearce was a director at Cognatum Estates Ltd. from December 2008 to May 2009.

Affiliations/honours
 Hon Colonel, 135 Independent Topological Squadron Royal Engineers (V)
 Hon Doctor of Science (City University, London)
 Hon Fellow, Thames Polytechnic's College of Estate Management

References

1933 births
Living people
Businesspeople from London
British business executives
British surveyors
Place of birth missing (living people)
Commanders of the Order of the British Empire
Knights Bachelor